The Naked and the Dead is a 1958 Technicolor widescreen film based on Norman Mailer's 1948 World War II novel The Naked and the Dead.  Directed by Raoul Walsh, screenplay by the Sanders brothers and filmed in Panama. The movie adds a strip tease and an action scene to the story in the novel.  It happens to be one of the last films produced by RKO before its closure, the film was released by Warner Bros. It was the last film that Raoul Walsh directed for Warner Bros as well.

Plot
Lieutenant Hearn is an aide to General Cummings, who treats Hearn as a son and a friend. The general believes that commanding officers should induce fear in their subordinates in order to enforce discipline. Hearn expresses distaste for these views, preferring instead that soldiers should have mutual respect for one another, regardless of rank.

Hearn is transferred to lead an intelligence and reconnaissance platoon on a dangerous mission. The platoon had originally been led by Sergeant Croft, who now must serve under Hearn. Croft is a professional soldier with a reputation for cruelty. Hearn's idealistic approach is contrasted with Croft's desire to win at all costs. When Hearn considers abandoning the mission in the face of formidable Japanese opposition, Croft tricks him into underestimating the enemy. This eventually leads to several deaths in the platoon, and Hearn himself is wounded. Some of the men retreat, carrying Hearn on a stretcher. Croft presses onward with the remaining men. He is killed in action, but his men accomplish their mission, relaying vital intelligence to headquarters. Hearn's men consider leaving him to die, as they can escape faster on their own, but continue carrying him despite the risk. 

Upon receiving the platoon's report, a subordinate of Cummings orders an immediate large-scale assault on the Japanese position, scoring a major victory despite Cummings's harsh skepticism. The survivors of the platoon, including Hearn, are able to reach headquarters. Once there, Hearn tells the chastized Cummings that the men who carried him on a stretcher did so out of love, and that the human spirit will always be too strong to be cowed by any terror imposed by other men.

Cast
 Aldo Ray as Staff Sergeant Sam Croft
 Cliff Robertson as First Lieutenant Robert Hearn
 Raymond Massey as Brigadier General Cummings
 Lili St. Cyr as Willa Mae / Lily
 Barbara Nichols as Mildred Croft
 William Campbell as Brown
 Richard Jaeckel as Gallagher
 James Best as Rhidges
 Joey Bishop as Roth
 Jerry Paris as Goldstein
 Robert Gist as "Red"
 L. Q. Jones as Woodrow "Woody" Wilson
 Max Showalter as Lieutenant Colonel Dalleson (credited as Casey Adams)
 John Beradino as Captain Mantelli (credited as John Berardino)
 Edward McNally as Cohn
 Greg Roman as Minetta

Production
The film was originally to be produced by Paul Gregory and directed by Charles Laughton, and was to be made after The Night of the Hunter. Terry and Dennis Sanders were hired as writers. Stanley Cortez, who had photographed The Night of the Hunter, was intended to be the cinematographer. Press releases announced that Robert Mitchum was to star and that Walter Schumann would compose the score. Following the box-office failure of The Night of the Hunter, Raoul Walsh replaced Gregory and recruited an uncredited writer to rewrite the Sanders Brothers screenplay. Cortez was replaced by Joseph LaShelle.

The Naked and the Dead was filmed on location in Panama with 250 American soldiers as extras. Hawaiian-born soldiers of Japanese descent were cast as Japanese soldiers and local actors from the Canal Zone Theatre Guild appeared in the film.

The film was produced in RKO-Scope, but when it was acquired by Warner Bros., it was billed as a WarnerScope film on release.

Reception
A.H. Weiler of The New York Times wrote: "Credit director, producer Paul Gregory and especially the writing team of Denis and Terry Sanders with laundering the billingsgate of the original and in extracting the derring-do of the author's impassioned work. But in so doing they have simply come up with a surface recounting of a platoon doomed to decimation in securing a small island in the Pacific in 1943. They have quickly limned a general who is a black-and-white militarist, nothing more, and of officers who only appear as quickly passing figures in a kaleidoscope of briefings and small talk."

References

External links
 
 
 
 
 Paul Gregory interview on the making of the film

1958 films
1958 war films
1950s English-language films
Films based on American novels
Films based on works by Norman Mailer
Films directed by Raoul Walsh
Films scored by Bernard Herrmann
Films set in Oceania
Films shot in Panama
Pacific War films
RKO Pictures films
Warner Bros. films
American World War II films